Forest Lawn Memorial Gardens, South is a cemetery in Plantation, Florida, founded in the early 1960s.

Notable burials at Forest Lawn include professional football player Carl Taseff (1938–2005).

External links
 Service Corporation International (official website)
 Dignity Memorial
 Forest Lawn Memorial Gardens, South – Location Website
 

Cemeteries in Florida
Protected areas of Broward County, Florida
Plantation, Florida